Koheda may refer to:

 Koheda, Rangareddy district, Telangana
 Koheda, Siddipet district, Telangana